is a 2014 Japanese comedy-drama film directed by Hitori Gekidan.

Cast
Yo Oizumi
Kō Shibasaki
Hitori Gekidan
Takashi Sasano
Morio Kazama

Reception
The film was number-two on its opening weekend, behind Frozen, with ¥180 million. It earned a total of billion (million) at the Japanese box office.

References

External links
 

2014 comedy-drama films
2014 directorial debut films
Films based on Japanese novels
Japanese comedy-drama films
Films scored by Naoki Satō
2010s Japanese films
2010s Japanese-language films